{{safesubst:#invoke:RfD||2="(Raimi-Verse)" as a disambiguator|month = March
|day =  6
|year = 2023
|time = 20:39
|timestamp = 20230306203952

|content=
REDIRECT Spider-Man (2002 film)

}}